Claverton Down is a suburb on the south-east hilltop edge of Bath, Somerset, England. It is linked to the Bathwick area of the city by Bathwick Hill.

Primarily a rural area with relatively few houses, it is home to the University of Bath, the headquarters of Wessex Water and a private golf course, the Bath Golf Course.

The American Museum is based at Claverton Manor, below Claverton Down on the road to the village of Claverton. Claverton Manor was designed by Jeffry Wyattville and built in the 1820s, and is a Grade I listed building.

References

Areas of Bath, Somerset
University of Bath